4x4 is the second extended play by American country music artist Granger Smith.  It serves as his official debut EP to mainstream radio.  The album's first single, "Backroad Song", was released to digital retailers and radio on March 24, 2015.  Also included on the album is a song from his comedic alter-ego "Earl Dibbles Jr.".  This extended play is also a preview of Smith's upcoming debut major label album, "Remington", which was released on March 4, 2016.

Critical reception
The website "For the Country Record" gave the EP a positive review, stating that the EP is "definitely easy on the ears", and "the lead single is the perfect summer song to jam out to while cruising down your own back roads".

Track listing

Chart performance
The album debuted on the Top Country Albums chart at No. 6, and Billboard 200 at No. 51, selling 8,700 copies for the week.

References 

2015 EPs
Granger Smith EPs
Albums produced by Frank Rogers (record producer)
BBR Music Group EPs